Tony Clegg may refer to:

Tony Clegg (businessman) (1937–1995), British property entrepreneur
Tony Clegg (footballer) (born 1965), English footballer